Klaus Lindenberger (born 28 May 1957 in Linz, Austria) is a retired Austrian football goalkeeper and former manager of Austrian Bundesliga side LASK Linz.

Club career
Lindenberger made his professional debut with LASK Linz in the 1976/1977 season and stayed with his hometown club for over ten years before moving to and winning silverware with FC Swarovski Tirol. After three years he returned to Linz to play for Stahl Linz. He finished his career with minor league side Eintracht Wels.

International career
He made his debut for Austria in an April 1982 friendly match against Czechoslovakia and was a participant at the 1982 and 1990 FIFA World Cups. He earned 43 caps, no goals scored. His last international was an August 1990 friendly match against Switzerland.

LASK subs on 24 March 2009 Lindenberger after nine months and named officialized Hans Krankl as new coach, Krankl, former Barcelona player, Lindenberger, however, remains at the club in the position of executive manager. 
.

Honours
Austrian Football Bundesliga (2):
 1989, 1990
Austrian Cup (1):
 1989

External links
 Official website - Klaus Lindenberger
 
 Profile - SK VOEST

References

1957 births
Living people
Footballers from Linz
Association football goalkeepers
Austrian footballers
Austria international footballers
1982 FIFA World Cup players
1990 FIFA World Cup players
LASK players
FC Swarovski Tirol players
Austrian Football Bundesliga players
Austrian football managers
LASK managers